The 1942 Fort Douglas MPs football team represented Fort Douglas during the 1942 college football season.  Under the coaching of a former Utah football player, Murray Maughan, the MPs (members of the Military Police Corps) compiled a 5–3 record, although they were outscored by their opponents by a total of 174 to 159.  On a December 2nd Associated Press poll for the ranking of service academies, Fort Douglas received a single tenth place vote, good enough to place them at No. 20 alongside Daniel Field and Camp Shelby.

Schedule

References

 
Fort Douglas
Fort Douglas MPs football